The1971 Oxford e Cambridge rugby union tour of Argentina and Brazil was a series of matches played between July and September 1971 by a selection of the British players of Oxford University RFC & Cambridge University R.U.F.C.

A mixed selection, formed also of many international players of British national team, students at Oxford  and Cambridge universities were arranged for this tour the fourth after the historical 1948, 1956, and 1965 tours. The matches were held in Buenos Aires and Rosario.

The university team lost both the test matches against Argentina national team.

Results 

Universidad de Neuquén: M. Cecheto; D. Segovia, F. Gómez, L. Lorences, A. Buitrago; J. Blok, J.
Leiva; G. Peralta, M. Kodelja, J. Escalada; O. Larice, A. Saravia; C. Silfeni (cap); H. Goncalves, R. Domínguez.
Oxford-Cambridge: P. Caroll (cap); I. Dunbar, C. Saville, P. Smith, G. Philips; J. Williams, B. Carroll; J. Redmond, W. Jones, S. James; P. Gordon, N. Witney; P. Hinto, P. Keith-Roach, A. Douglas. 

Mendoza: J. Castro; M. Brandi, O. Terranova, R. Tarquini, E. Gandía; C. Navesi, L. Chacón; J. Navesi, E. Casale (cap), J. Nasazzi; E. Sánchez, A. Cataneo; C. Guiñazú, L. Ramos, R. Irañeta.
Oxford-Cambridge: P. Carroll; G. Phillips, R. Jones, K. Hughes, T. Dunbar; D. Bell, J. Page; P. Gordon, G. Redmond, W. Jones; A. Rodgers, N. Witny; R. Skiner, D. Barry, N. Hinton 

Córdoba: F.Mezquida; E.Vaca Narvaja, G.Pispiero, C.Antoraz, J.J.Rubio; R.Agüero, J.Vera; C.Cottorano, H.Barrea, D.Torrecillas; R.Pasaglia, R.Borsdoch; G.Ribeca, A.Paz, R.Dunn
Oxford-Cambridge: P.Carroll; G.Philips, K.Hughes, P.Smith, R.Jones; J.Williams, B.Carroll; S.James, G.Redmond, W.Jones; D.Greenwood, A.Rodgers; N.Hinton, P.Keith-Roach, A.Douglas. 

Tucumán: J.Vega; C.Cisint, R.Grunauer, C.Odstril, J.Rojas; C.Rojas, C.Nieva; J.Bach, J.Ghiringhelli (capt.), J.Veglia; I.Iramain, O.Ferrari; J.Olmos, M.Iramain, C.Pérez
Oxford-Cambridge: P.Carroll (capt.); G.Phillips, D.Bell, S.Saville, R.Jones; J.Williams, J.Page; W.Jones, S.Janes, D.Greenwood; K.Witney, A.Rodgers; A.Douglas, D.Parry, R.Skinner. 

 Santa Fe: E.Amanzio; F.Williams, H.Lauría, G.Ibazquez, A.Eckard; B.Kreczmann, E.Tenca; A.Donet, A.Fidalgo, R.Campanella; D.Mota, P.Giardini; J.Colombo, J.Aguilera, R.González.
Oxford-Cambridge: P.Carroll (capt.); G.Phillips, P.Smith, K.Hughes, R.Jones; J.Williams, J.Page;
R.Wilkinson, P.Gordon, S.Jones; N.Witney, R.Rodgers; R.Skinner, P.Keith-Roach, P.Milton 

 Rosario: L.Huljich; C.García, C.Blanco, J.Seaton, G.Blanco; J.Scilabra, M.Escalante; M.Chesta (cap.), J.Imhoff, E.Mainnini; H.Suárez, M.Senatore; R.Fariello, J.Fradua, S.Furno.
Oxford-Cambridge: P.Carroll (cap.); G.Phillips, P.Smith, K.Hughes, R.Jones; D.Bell, J.Page; R.Wilkinson, P.Gordon, A.Jones; N.Witney, R.Rodgers; N.Hinton, D.Parry, A.Douglas. 

 Buenos Aires: M.Alonso; J.Otaola, M.Rodríguez Jurado, L.Esteras, G.Escobar;C.Martínez, M.Cutler (capt.); M.Iglesias, J.Braceras, J.Carracedo; J.Borghi, C.Gomis; F.Insúa, G.Casas, O.Carbone
Oxford-Cambridge: P.Carroll (capt.); G.Phillips, C.Saville, K.Hughes, I.Dunbar; D.Bell, B.Carroll; S.
James, G.Redmon, W.Jones; R.Wilkinson, A.Rodgers; P.Hinton, P.D ́A.Keith-Roach, R.Skinner. 

Mar del Plata: J.Viders; D.Filippa, C.Sosa (capt.), F.Uriaguereca, G.Severino; R.L ́Erario, R.Caparelli; R.Panzarini, M.Riego, E.Feullasier; W.Heathi, D.Cordasco; R.Bonomo, M.Blanco, D.Sepe.
Oxford-Cambridge: P.Carroll; P.Greenwood, G.Redmon, S.James; M.Witney, P.Gordon; R.Skinner, D.Parry, A.Douglas.

References 

1971 rugby union tours
1971 in Argentine rugby union
Rugby union tours of Argentina
1971
1970–71 in English rugby union
Rugby union tours of Brazil
rugby